KRI Ajak is an PB-57 Mk II (Andau class) ASW patrol boats operated by the Indonesian Navy.

Notable deployments
KRI Ajak was deployed to help look for the missing Adam Air Flight 574.

References

Patrol vessels of the Indonesian Navy
Naval ships of Indonesia